The Alaska-Juneau Gold Mining Company (AJGMC) was incorporated under the laws of West Virginia, USA in 1897.

Mining properties and operations
The company's property was in Alaska's Juneau mining district. The AJGMC purchased over two dozen patented claims in the Silver Bow Basin for lode mining low grade gold ore. About  of outlying group claims were in Snowslide Gulch. Tunnels and the mill site stretched to the Gastineau Channel.

The property also included the Lane & Hayward mine and the Bennet mine. The company's two stamp mills, driven exclusively by water power, were located on Gold Creek. Its 30-stamp mill was in operation from 1896 to 1914. The Ebner Gold Mining Company property adjoined the AJGMC on the northwest.

Business operations
Its Transfer Agent was Central Trust Company while its Registrar was Metropolitan Trust Company. The corporation office was located in Charleston, West Virginia.  The Annual meeting was held on the first Tuesday after the first Monday in April at the San Francisco office.

The AJGMC and the Alaska Treadwell Gold Mining Company had integrated management and stockholding interests as, in 1900, Frederick W. Bradley purchased a major interest in AJGMC.  He became president of AJGMC and Treadwell. Philip R. Bradley, brother of Frederick, was resident manager during the period of 1914-1920. The business offices of both these companies, as well as the Alaska-Gastineau Mining Company, were in the Mill Building, San Francisco, California. The working offices and records were located at the Treadwell gold mine on the north side of Douglas Island. In 1922, the office and records were moved to the AJGMC mining area on the other side of the Gastineau Channel.

After the Alaska-Juneau mine closed in 1944 because of the World War II labor shortage,  AJGMC sold its hydroelectric power to Alaska Electric Light & Power, Juneau's local utility company. In 1972, AEL&P purchased all of the AJGMC holdings.

References

Gold mining in Alaska
Defunct mining companies of the United States
Defunct companies based in Alaska
Defunct companies based in West Virginia
Non-renewable resource companies established in 1897
Non-renewable resource companies disestablished in 1944
1897 establishments in West Virginia
1944 disestablishments in Alaska